Juni may refer to:

People 
Given name
 Juni Marie Benjaminsen (born 1999), Norwegian figure skater
 Juni Chakma, Bangladeshi kabaddi player
 Juni Dahr (born 1953), Norwegian actress
 Juni Fisher (born ), American singer-songwriter

Surname
 Juan de Juni (–1577), French–Spanish sculptor
 Masoud Juni (1939–1991), Syrian writer
 Peter Jüni, Swiss physician

Places 
 Juni, Ghana, a village in the Tamale Metropolitan District in the Northern Region of Ghana
 Juni, Iran, a village in West Azerbaijan Province, Iran
 Juni Lake, a lake in Minnesota

Other uses 
 Juni (album), by drummer Peter Erskine
 Juni Cortez, a character from the Spy Kids films
 June List, a Swedish political party
 June Movement, a Danish political party
 Juni, character from Street Fighter, see list of Street Fighter characters